Mofidabad (also Romanized as Mofīdābād) is a village in Sadan Rostaq-e Sharqi Rural District, in the Central District of Kordkuy County, Golestan Province, Iran. In 2015, the population of Mofidabad was declared 361 with 111 families.

References 

Populated places in Kordkuy County